The Refreshments are a multiple gold and platinum album selling Swedish rock group formed in 1989 in Gävle, whose works have been nominated for Grammy Awards.

During their first years they mainly played covers of 1950s rock and roll songs. They originally started playing as "The King-Cats," but changed their name to The Refreshments in 1991. Their 1995 first album, Both Rock'n'Roll, was followed by 1997's Trouble Boys. Both albums were produced by Billy Bremner, who also played in the band for a few years.

Eleven of the band's fourteen original songs (as of 2011) have been written by bass player Joakim Arnell. Since piano player Johan Blohm joined the band, they have also played an occasional country song. Two of their biggest hits are "Miss You Miss Belinda" and "One Dance, One Rose, One Kiss". The band's 2003 album Rock'n'Roll X-mas placed number 1 on the Swedish music chart. 

The Refreshments have also worked with Dave Edmunds, a collaboration that resulted in the live album A Pile Of Rock.  In addition, the band has featured the legendary British guitarist Albert Lee.

Discography

Albums
1995: Both Rock'n'Roll
1997: Trouble Boys
1999: Are You Ready
2000: Musical Fun for Everyone
2001: Real Songs on Real Instruments
2001: Here We Are - Best of The Refreshments
2003: On the Rocks
2003: Rock'n'Roll X-Mas
2004: Easy to Pickup Hard to Put Down
2006: 24-7
2006: It's Gotta Be Both Rock and Roll
2007  Rock On
2007  Christmas Spirits
2008: Jukebox - Refreshing Classics
2009: A Band's Gotta Do What A Band's Gotta Do
2009  Rarities
2011: Ridin' Along with the Refreshments
2012: Highways and Biways
2013: Let It Rock - The Chuck Berry Tribute
2014: Wow Factor
2016: Straight Up
2019: Real Rock 'n' Roll

With other artists:
1997: A Pile of Rock - Live (backup band for Dave Edmunds)
2001: Brit Rock - Back On Track (backup band for Dave Edmunds, Steve Gibbons, Billy Bremner and Mickey Jupp)

Singles
2014: "Hallelujah"

Movies
2004 One Night With The Refreshments Live in Concert2005 The Refreshments Live''

References

External links 
The Refreshments

Swedish rock music groups
Melodifestivalen contestants of 2014